Sampson Atakora is a Ghanaian Politician and a member of the Third Parliament of the Fourth Republic representing the Ejura Sekyedumasi in the Ashanti Region of Ghana.

Early life and education 
Atakora was born at  Ejura Sekyedumasi, a town in the Ashanti Region of Ghana.

Politics 
Atakora was first elected into parliament on the Ticket of the National Democratic Congress during the 2000 Ghanaian General Elections. He polled 10,787 votes out of the 25,679 valid votes cast representing 42.00% He was defeated by Alhaji Issifu Pangabu Mohammed in the 2004 parties primary elections.

Career 
Atakora is an Engineer at the Community Water and Sanitation Agency. He also is a former member of Parliament for the  Ejura Sekyedumasi Constituency in the Ashanti Region of Ghana.

Arrest 
On October 19, 2004, he was arrested for visa fraud. It was alleged that he tried to use fake birth certificates to acquire America visa for his two children.

References 

Year of birth missing (living people)
Living people
National Democratic Congress (Ghana) politicians
People from Ashanti Region
Ghanaian MPs 2001–2005
Ghanaian civil engineers